Untold Scandal (lit. "Scandal: The Love Story of Men and Women in Joseon") is a 2003 South Korean romantic drama film directed by E J-yong, and starring Bae Yong-joon, Jeon Do-yeon, and Lee Mi-sook. Loosely based on the 1782 French novel Les Liaisons dangereuses, this adaptation takes place in late 18th century Korea, during the Joseon dynasty.

In Korea the film was given an R-18 rating by the Korean Film Ethics Commission. The film was a major commercial success, and became the fourth highest grossing domestic film of 2003 with 3,522,747 tickets sold nationwide.

Plot 
A beautiful but cynical and manipulative noblewoman makes a bet with her free-spirited womanizing cousin that he can have sex with her if he is able to seduce a young woman of great virtue. He accepts the challenge with enthusiasm though not suspecting the nasty trap he is walking into.

Cast 
 Bae Yong-joon – Jo-won (Vicomte Sébastien de Valmont)
 Jeon Do-yeon – Lady Jeong (Madame Marie de Tourvel)
 Lee Mi-sook – Lady Cho (Marquise Isabelle de Merteuil)
 Lee So-yeon – Lee So-ok (Cécile de Volanges)
 Jo Hyun-jae – Kwon In-ho (Cécile's music tutor Chevalier Raphael Danceny)
 Lee Mi-ji – So-ok's mother (Cécile's mother Madame de Volanges)
 – Madam Jo's husband (Merteuil's former love, the Comte de Gercourt)
 Choi Ban-ya – Chu Wol-yi
 Choi Sung-min – slave
 Jeon Yang-ja – Vice-Premier's wife
 Seo Yoon-ah – Jung-geum
 Han Yi-bin – Eun-sil
 Jung Jae-jin – elder 2
 Kong Ho-suk – elder 3
 Na Han-il – Nobleman Yoo

Differences from the original novel 
Monsieur de Tourvel (Madame Marie de Tourvel/Lady Jeong's husband), who was away for a court case in the novel, was in the film deceased, making Lady Jeong a widow of nine years. Furthermore, Lady Jeong lived in Ganghwa Island, and in the film, she is living in Seoul as there was a plague at her hometown at that time.

Jo-won (Vicomte Sébastien de Valmont) and Madam Jo (Marquise Isabelle de Merteuil) were in the film cousins (Jo-won the younger cousin), and it is revealed that Jo-won's first love was Madam Jo, whereas in the novel, they were rivals, yet using the same tools for their revenge: sex.

Marquise Isabelle de Merteuil (Madam Jo)'s former lover is arranged to be Cécile's future husband in the novel, but in the film, his character is Madam Jo's husband. In So-ok's case, she is being made into a concubine of Madam Jo's husband for the continuity of the family lineage with the elders' consent.

Lee So-ok (Cécile de Volanges) was ushered in to Madam Jo's care to be the concubine of her husband, and is conspiring with Jo-won to make her pregnant for revenge (with Madam Jo telling her husband what really happened to So-ok at her husband's deathbed).

Chevalier Raphael Danceny was originally Cécile's music tutor in the novel, but in the film, Kwon In-ho (Raphael Danceny's counterpart) is the youngest son of Madam Jo's next-door neighbor and also Lady Jeong's cousin.

Awards and nominations 
2003 Pusan International Film Festival
 NETPAC Award

2003 Blue Dragon Film Awards
 Best New Actor – Bae Yong-joon
 Nomination – Best Actress – Jeon Do-yeon
 Nomination – Best Actress – Lee Mi-sook

2004 Baeksang Arts Awards
 Best New Actor – Bae Yong-joon

2004 Verona Film Festival
 Stefano Reggiani Prize (from the Veneto's Order of Journalists)
 Best Artistic, Technical, or Creative Contribution

2004 Grand Bell Awards
 Best Costume Design – Jung Ku-ho, Kim Hee-ju
 Nomination – Best Film
 Nomination – Best Director – E J-yong
 Nomination – Best Actress – Jeon Do-yeon
 Nomination – Best Actress – Lee Mi-sook
 Nomination – Best New Actor – Bae Yong-joon
 Nomination – Best Planning – Lee Yoo-jin
 Nomination – Best Adapted Screenplay – Kim Dae-woo, E J-yong, Kim Hyeon-jeong
 Nomination – Best Cinematography – Kim Byeong-il
 Nomination – Best Art Direction – Jung Ku-ho
 Nomination – Best Music – Lee Byung-woo

2004 Shanghai International Film Festival
 Best Director – E J-yong
 Best Music – Lee Byung-woo 
 Best Visual Effects – Lee Jeon-hyeong
 Best Sound Effects – Lee Seung-chul

2004 Korean Film Awards
 Best Art Direction – Jung Ku-ho
 Nomination – Best Actress – Lee Mi-sook
 Nomination – Best Director – E J-yong
 Nomination – Best Cinematography – Kim Byeong-il
 Nomination – Best Music – Lee Byung-woo

References

External links 
  
 Untold Scandal at Tiscali UK/TalkTalk Group (website created by UK actor and designer Adam Jennings)
 
 

2003 films
2003 romantic drama films
South Korean romantic drama films
South Korean historical drama films
Films set in the 18th century
Films set in the Joseon dynasty
Films based on French novels
Films based on works by Pierre Choderlos de Laclos
Films directed by E J-yong
Films with screenplays by Kim Dae-woo
2000s Korean-language films
Works based on Les Liaisons dangereuses
2000s South Korean films